Manda Leima (born 22 March) is an actress who appears in Manipuri films. She is best known for her role of Leihao in the 2002 movie Lallasi Pal. Angangba Kurao Mapal, Ingengi Atiya, Thengmankhre Thabalse, Inga Nonglakta, Kaboklei and Lanphamda Ibeni are some of her famous films.

Manda Leima was the face of Shingju Festival 2020.

Career
Manda Leima obtained the knowledge of acting before coming into films from her father, who was also a theatre artiste and writer. Her first film is Mangluraba Thawai. She got a breakthrough in the 2002 movie Lallasi Pal, where she portrayed the role of Leihao. Angangba Kurao Mapal, Thengmankhre Thabalse, Inga Nonglakta, Ayukki Likla and Lanphamda Ibeni are notable films where she associated with the renowned filmmaker Romi Meitei. Moirangthem Inao's collaboration with the actress are marked by movies like Nangna Mama Oibiyu, Laang and Nongallabasu Thaballei Manam.

She took a break from acting after her marriage. Her comeback was in 2009 with the release of the movie Kaboklei which became a hit. As of 2018, she starred in Pilu Heigrujam's directorial venture Soinairaba Thamoi. It was scripted by Herojit Naoroibam.

In 2020, she appeared in the non-feature Nawa Seidum directed by Lawrence Chandam. The film got selection in the Micro Film Finalist at the Indie Short Fest, Los Angeles, 2020. It also bagged the Outstanding Achievement Award at the Tagore International Film Festival 2020 and Best Narrative Film in Moment International 2020.

Accolades
Manda Leima bagged the Best Actress in Manipuri Film award at the North East TV People's Choice Awards 2004 held at Guwahati. She was also conferred the 1st Late P. Kenedy Memorial Filmfare Award 2004 by the Educated Unemployed Self-Service Association, Moirang. She received the Best Actress in a Leading Role - Female award for her titular role in Kaboklei'' at the 7th Manipur State Film Festival 2010.

Selected filmography

External links

References 

Indian film actresses
21st-century Indian actresses
Leima
Meitei people
People from Imphal
Actresses from Manipur
Actresses in Meitei cinema
Living people
Year of birth missing (living people)